The citrus long-horned beetle (Anoplophora chinensis, also appearing in many sources as Anoplophora malasiaca) is a long-horned beetle native to Japan, China, Korea, and Southeast Asia where it is considered a serious pest. Several countries in Europe had been infested with this insect in the past, including Italy, Switzerland, Turkey, France, Germany, and Croatia.

Each female citrus long-horned beetle can lay up to 200 eggs after mating; each egg is individually deposited in tree bark. After the beetle larva hatches, it chews into the tree, forming a tunnel that is then used as a place for pupation. From egg-laying to pupation and adult emergence can take one to two years.

Infestations by the beetle can kill many different types of hardwood trees including Citrus, pecan, apple, Australian pine, Hibiscus, sycamore, willow, pear, mulberry, chinaberry, poplar, Litchi, kumquat, Japanese red cedar, oak, and Ficus.

In America 

The citrus long-horned beetle poses an unprecedented threat to the environment in North America because it attacks healthy trees and has no natural enemies. Not only are greenbelts, urban landscapes and backyard trees threatened, but also orchards, forests, endangered salmon, and wildlife habitats.

The citrus long-horned beetle was first discovered in the U.S. in April 1999, when a single beetle was found in a nursery greenhouse in Athens, Georgia on certain bonsai trees imported from China. More seriously, the beetle was later discovered on 9 August 2001, at a Tukwila, Washington nursery near Seattle in a shipment from Korea of 369 bonsai maple trees. Three of the beetles were captured at the nursery, including a mated female ready to lay eggs, but when the bonsai trees were dissected, eight larvae exit tunnels were found, indicating that five more might have escaped into the surrounding community. Those five could lead to thousands of others because females lay 200 eggs each. Because this beetle may have other outlying infestations that are yet to be discovered, it is recommended not to move firewood,  even in areas with no known infestations.

UK

The beetle was found in several sightings in Essex in 2008.

See also 
 Invasive species

References

External links

EPPO pdf
DEFRA/CSL and Forestry Commission UK Publication
COMMISSION DECISION on emergency measures to prevent the introduction into and the spread within the Community of Anoplophora chinensis (Forster) pdf
 Species Profile- Citrus Longhorned Beetle (Anoplophora chinensis), National Invasive Species Information Center, United States National Agricultural Library. Lists general information and resources for Citrus Longhorned Beetle.
Neue Westfälische from 3 July 2008
Defra News release 14 August 2008

Lamiini
Beetles of Asia
Agricultural pest insects
Insect pests of temperate forests
Beetles described in 1771